Au ZH railway station is a railway station in Switzerland, situated in the village of Au in the municipality of Wädenswil in the canton of Zürich. The station is located on the Lake Zürich left bank railway line, and is served by line S8 of the Zürich S-Bahn.

As conventions change, the station's name "Au ZH" was previously written "Au (ZH)" or "Au (Zürich)".

References

External links 
 
 

Railway stations in Switzerland opened in 1875
Railway stations in the canton of Zürich
Swiss Federal Railways stations
Wädenswil